A is the 13th studio album by British rock band Jethro Tull. It was released on 29 August 1980 in the UK and 1 September of the same year in the United States.

The album was initially written and recorded with the intention of being frontman Ian Anderson's debut solo album (hence the album's title: the master tapes were marked "A" for Anderson during recording), however the album was eventually released as a Jethro Tull album after pressure from Chrysalis Records. Anderson has since stated that he regrets allowing the album to be released under the Jethro Tull name.

Musically, the album was a departure from prior Tull works, adopting more of an electronic rock sound with heavy use of synthesizers, although still retaining the band's trademark folk influence and Anderson's flute playing. Lyrically, the album saw a similar departure from the fantasy and folklore themes of previous Tull work, instead emphasizing contemporary matters such as the Cold War. The album was the first Tull album released following a large lineup change which saw drummer Barrie "Barriemore" Barlow and keyboardists John Evan and Dee Palmer departing the band in 1980 while bassist John Glascock had died from heart complications the previous year. The album instead features Glascock's touring replacement Dave Pegg on bass in his first recorded appearance with the band, Mark Craney on drums and Eddie Jobson on keyboards (with Jobson credited as a "special guest") and electric violin.

Overview 
A was recorded as an intended Ian Anderson solo album before Tull's record label, Chrysalis, asked that it become credited to the group. This is the reason for the album's title, as the tapes were marked "A" for "Anderson". It is noted for its more synthesiser-based sound, a fact which created controversy among many of the band's fans. On the other hand, it features a folk-influenced piece, "The Pine Marten's Jig".

A features a dramatically different line-up of Tull from the band's previous album, Stormwatch (1979). Former keyboardist John Evan and organist Dee Palmer were fired from the group, while drummer Barriemore Barlow left the band due to depression over the death of John Glascock as well as plans to start his own band.

The only members of Tull to appear on both Stormwatch (1979) and A (1980) are Ian Anderson and Martin Barre. This is also bassist Dave Pegg's first appearance on a Tull studio recording, but he had become a member of the band during the Stormwatch tour in 1979, replacing the deceased Glascock. Conflicting reasons have been given for the line-up change. Anderson has stated that he wanted to take the band in a different direction from the folk rock and progressive rock of the 1970s.

Barriemore Barlow was unhappy with the direction the band was taking and later stated that he would have left anyway. However, biographer David Rees reports in his book Minstrels in the Gallery: A History of Jethro Tull (2001) that Anderson had never intended to replace Jethro Tull's previous line-up with the musicians who recorded A, but was forced by Chrysalis Records, which had decided to release his 'solo' album under the name Jethro Tull. This claim was further evidenced by Anderson's note in the 2003 re-release of the album.

A 40th anniversary box set was released in April 2021, featuring the album remixed by Steven Wilson.  It includes some bonus tracks, a DVD of Slipstream, and audio of a concert in Los Angeles.

Track listing 

The 2004 remastered two-disc edition includes Slipstream as a bonus DVD.

2021 40th Anniversary A La Mode Edition

Personnel 
Jethro Tull
 Ian Anderson – vocals, flute
 Martin Barre – guitar
 Dave Pegg – bass guitar, mandolin
 Mark Craney – drums

Additional personnel
 Eddie Jobson – keyboards, synthesizer, electric violin on The Pine Marten's Jig 

technical staff
 Robin Black – sound engineer
 John Shaw – photography
 Peter Wagg – art direction

Charts

References

External links 
 
  (Bonus DVD)

Jethro Tull (band) albums
1980 albums
Chrysalis Records albums
Island Records albums
Albums produced by Ian Anderson